Bombada United is a football club from Brikama in the West African state of Gambia. They currently play in the top domestic GFA League First Division since promoting to the league for the 2015 season.

References

External links
Soccerway – Gambia 2015 season
Football clubs in the Gambia